Ferdinand Ries's Violin Sonata in E-flat major Op. 18, was published in 1810 by Simrock with a dedication to a "Mademoiselle Maria Held". As with all of the composers published violin sonatas the work is for piano with violin accompaniment.

Structure

The sonata is in three movements:

 Allegro
 Andantino 
 Allegretto moderato

Typical performances should take around 30 minutes.

References
Notes

Sources

External links
 

Violin sonatas by Ferdinand Ries
1810 compositions
Compositions in E-flat major
Music with dedications